Trichopoda indivisa is a species of feather-legged flies in the family Tachinidae. It is found in North America.

References

 O'Hara, James E., and D. Monty Wood (2004). "Catalogue of the Tachinidae (Diptera) of America North of Mexico". Memoirs on Entomology, International, vol. 18, 410.

Further reading

 Diptera.info
 NCBI Taxonomy Browser, Trichopoda indivisa
 

Phasiinae